Assidat Zgougou ( εasidet ezgougou) is a Tunisian dessert often prepared to celebrate the Mūled. It was originally made out of Aleppo pine, Flour, milk, cream and, nuts. That one variant of the dish is now known as "εasida Tunisia".

Preparation 
The lower layer is made of the grains (pine nut seeds) of Aleppo pines, "zgougou", not to be confused with pine nuts of stone pines or pinus armandii. The grains are cleaned, then ground in water, and sieved to very small sizes. The resulting juicy substance is then mixed with wheat flour and/or starch depending on the recipe. Sometimes concentrated milk is added. Then everything is cooked at low heat while stirred. Powdered sugar is added gradually as the mixture thickens, giving rise to a grayish-brown color.

The result is poured hot into a bowl and covered in a white cream made from milk, starch, sugar, eggs, and a bit of orange blossom essence, then decorated with almonds and other seeds and nuts, whole or ground, and small candy.

It is also possible to make an assida out of other nuts instead of the allepo pine's grains, like hazelnuts, chestnuts, pistachios, or others, but in that case, it won't be assidat zgougou but assidat of what was used.

Usage 
Traditionally, Tunisians exchange bowls of Assidat Zgougou among neighbors and family members on the Mūled, thus rendering decoration as important as the taste. Many use all sorts of seeds and nuts, ground or whole, to vary the forms and colors of the decoration.

References

Arab cuisine
North African cuisine
Tunisian cuisine